The Shushicë or Vlora river is a river in southern Albania, tributary of the Vjosë. Its source is in the Vlorë County, near the village Kuç, municipality Himarë. It flows generally northwest through Brataj, Kotë and Shushicë and flows into the Vjosë near Armen, northeast of Vlorë.

The agricultural use of the river valley is very intensive and begins at the headwaters. Along the river there are so far three bridges which are located on the lower reaches at Peshkëpi , Drashovicë and Kotë.

In December 1940, during the Greco-Italian War of the World War II, the advancing Greek forces penetrated through Shushicë valley pushing back the Italian units in a successful operation that lead to the fall of Himara. In late 1943 the area was the battlefield of the battle of Drashovica.

In antiquity the river was called Polyanthos and Chaonites.

References

Rivers of Albania
Geography of Vlorë County
Braided rivers in Albania